Nokona coracodes is a moth of the family Sesiidae. It is only known from Toowoomba, Queensland.

Taxonomy
Nokona coracodes was placed as a synonym of Nokona carulifera, but was reinstated as a valid species per Kallies, 2001.

References

External links
Classification of the Superfamily Sesioidea (Lepidoptera: Ditrysia)
New records and a revised checklist of the Australian clearwing moths (Lepidoptera: Sesiidae)

Moths of Australia
Sesiidae
Moths described in 1922